Sarah Palacin (born 2 November 1988) is a French footballer who plays for Division 2 Féminine club . She has previously played for Val d'Orge, FF Issy, Saint-Étienne, Paris Saint-Germain, FC Fleury 91, and Olympique de Marseille. Between 2015 and 2016, she made two appearances for the France under-23s team.

Club career
Palacin started playing football aged nine in Le Plessis-Pâté. She played for four years at Val d'Orge, before moving to FF Issy, where she played from 2008 until 2011. In that time, FF Issy were promoted from Division 3 Féminine to Division 2 Féminine. Between 2011 and 2016, Palacin played for Division 1 Féminine club Saint-Étienne. She scored 15 goals for Saint-Étienne in the 2014–15 season, making her the team's top scorer. She scored a hat-trick in a February 2015 match against FF Issy. In the 2015–16 season, she scored eight goals.

In 2016, Palacin signed for Paris Saint-Germain Féminine. She signed a one-year contract, with an option of another year. In April 2017, she fractured her fibula, which ruled her out for the remainder of the season. In June 2017, she signed for FC Fleury 91 (formerly Val d'Orge).

International career
Palacin has made two appearances for the France-under 23 team, in 2015 and 2016 matches against Poland B.

Personal life
Palacin is from Longjumeau, a suburb of Paris. Her father was a footballer in Le Plessis-Pâté.

References

External links
 
 
 Footo Feminin 
 

1988 births
Living people
French women's footballers
Women's association football forwards
France women's youth international footballers
Division 1 Féminine players
Paris Saint-Germain Féminine players
Olympique de Marseille (women) players
GPSO 92 Issy players
People from Longjumeau
FC Fleury 91 (women) players
AS Saint-Étienne (women) players
Footballers from Essonne